Zehlendorf can refer to:

Zehlendorf (Berlin), a district in Berlin, Germany
Zehlendorf bei Oranienburg, a small village north of Berlin, part of Oranienburg
Sender Zehlendorf, a radio transmission site